Delias agoranis, the Burmese Jezebel, is a butterfly in the family Pieridae. It was described by Henley Grose-Smith in 1887. It is found in the Indomalayan realm, where it has been recorded from southern Burma and south-western Thailand.

References

External links
Delias at Markku Savela's Lepidoptera and Some Other Life Forms

agoranis
Butterflies described in 1887